St. Leonard's Church in Lipnica Murowana - a Gothic, wooden church located in the village of Lipnica Murowana from the fifteenth-century, which together with different churches is designated as part of the UNESCO Wooden Churches of Southern Lesser Poland.

History

The church is located by the Uszwica river, beyond the former levee in Lipnica Murowana. The church was most likely built at the end of the fifteenth-century, on the location of a former church. According to the town's tradition, the church was built in 1143 or 1203 - this date can be seen on the north-east wall of the chancel - in the location of a former pagan chram.

The church is found today in a near untouched structure, and belongs to the most notable wooden Gothic churches in Poland. The church is orientated, built from wooden framework, bipartite. The chancel is surrounded by three walls. The nave is wider, in the shape of a square. In the seventeenth-century, the church was surrounded with picturesque soboty (wooden undercut supported by pillars), during which a bell tower was constructed. There is no sacristy by the chancel. The roof is covered with wood shingle, with tradition, there are only windows in the southern side of the church, with the entrance doors to the south and west of the church.

Gallery

References

World Heritage Sites in Poland
Bochnia County
Lipnica Murowana
Conversion of non-Christian religious buildings and structures into churches
Wooden churches in Poland